Mélanie Henique (born 22 December 1992) is a French competitive swimmer. She won a bronze medal in the 50 metre butterfly at the 2011 World Championships and a silver medal in the 50 metre butterfly at the 2022 World Aquatics Championships.

Career
At the 2011 World Aquatics Championships, held in Shanghai, China, Henique achieved a time of 25.86 seconds in the final of the 50 metre butterfly and won the bronze medal, finishing 0.15 seconds behind gold medalist Inge Dekker of the Netherlands.

Henique qualified to represent France at the 2020 Summer Olympics. At the Olympic Games, held in Tokyo, Japan in 2021 due to the COVID-19 pandemic, she tied Simone Manuel of the United States for eleventh place in the 50 metre freestyle with a time of 24.63 seconds.

At the 2022 World Aquatics Championships, held at Danube Arena in Budapest, Hungary, Henique won the silver medal in the 50 metre butterfly with a time of 25.31 seconds, finishing less than four-tenths of a second behind gold medalist Sarah Sjöström of Sweden and one-hundredth of a second ahead of bronze medalist Zhang Yufei of China.

Personal life
In 2014, she was 55th on Brigitte Fouré's list for the municipal elections in Amiens.

In 2015, being openly lesbian, she was a victim of a homophobic attack in Amiens, suffering from a broken nose and forcing her to withdraw from the French Swimming Open.

References

External links 

1992 births
Living people
French female freestyle swimmers
French female butterfly swimmers
French female medley swimmers
Olympic swimmers of France
Swimmers at the 2016 Summer Olympics
World Aquatics Championships medalists in swimming
Medalists at the FINA World Swimming Championships (25 m)
European Aquatics Championships medalists in swimming
Sportspeople from Amiens
LGBT swimmers
French LGBT sportspeople
Mediterranean Games gold medalists for France
Swimmers at the 2009 Mediterranean Games
Mediterranean Games medalists in swimming
Lesbian sportswomen
Swimmers at the 2020 Summer Olympics
20th-century French women
21st-century French women